Abaciscus is a genus of moths in the family Geometridae.

Species
 Abaciscus atmala (Swinhoe, 1894)
 Abaciscus costimacula (Wileman, 1912)
 Abaciscus figlina Swinhoe
 Abaciscus intractabilis (Walker, 1864)
 Abaciscus kathmandensis Sato, 1993
 Abaciscus lutosus Holloway, 1993
 Abaciscus paucisignata (Warren, 1899)
 Abaciscus shaneae Holloway, 1993
 Abaciscus stellifera (Warren, 1896)
 Abaciscus tristis Butler, 1889

References
 Abaciscus at Markku Savela's Lepidoptera and some other life forms

Boarmiini
Geometridae genera